Chagarcía Medianero is a village and municipality in the province of Salamanca, western Spain, part of the autonomous community of Castile-Leon.

The post code is 37861.

References

Municipalities in the Province of Salamanca